Pontevedra-University is a suburban railway stop on the Redondela-Santiago de Compostela line. It is located in the municipality of Pontevedra, to the north of the city, in the autonomous community of Galicia in Spain.

Opened in 2001, it is served by Media Distancia Renfe. It serves the university campus.

Railway location 
At an altitude of 17 metres, the Pontevedra-Universidad railway stop is located at kilometre point (KP) 19.9 of the Redondela-Santiago de Compostela Iberian-gauge line, between the railway stations of Pontevedra and Portela.

History 
In November 1998, specific dates began to be discussed for the construction of a railway stop near the Pontevedra campus. The works for the railway stop to the campus were awarded in July 1999.

The Pontevedra-Universidad stop was finally put into service by Renfe in October 2001 to serve the Pontevedra campus.

Since 31 December 2004, ADIF has been the operator of the railway stop. In June 2021, ADIF decided to improve the access ramps to the stop and the lighting.

Traveller services

Description 
The railway stop has two platforms with video surveillance, shelters and electronic information boards indicating train arrivals and departures, a device for emergency calls and a clock.

Services 
Pontevedra-Universidad is served by trains of the Media Distancia Renfe service, mainly originating or terminating at the railway stations of A Coruña, Pontevedra, Santiago de Compostela and Vigo-Guixar.

Intermodal passenger transport 
Buses serve the train stop and the university campus.

Gallery

References

See also

Related articles 
 Pontevedra railway station
 Administrador de infraestructuras ferroviarias

External links 
 Media Distancia Galice on the website Renfe.
 Pontevedra-Universidad stop on the Adif official website.

Railway stations in Galicia (Spain)
Railway stations in Spain opened in 2001
Transport in Galicia (Spain)
Buildings and structures in the Province of Pontevedra
Pontevedra
Pontevedra Campus
Transport in Pontevedra